Nova TV may refer to:

Television channels
 Nova BH, Bosnia and Herzegovina
 Nova (Bulgaria)
 Nova Sport (Bulgaria)
 Kino Nova, Bulgaria
 Nova (Croatia)
 Nova (Czech Republic)
 Nova Cinema (Czech Republic)
 Nova Sport (Czech Republic and Slovakia)
 Nova Sport 1
 Nova Sport 2
 Nova Sport 3
 Nova Sport 4
 Nova (Forthnet)
 Nova Cinema (Greece)
 Nova Sports, Greece
 Nova M, Montenegro
 Nova TV (Romania)
 Nova (Spain)
 Nova S, Serbia
 Nova Televisión, Colombia

Defunct channels
 Nova TV (Iceland) – a former 24-hour music channel 
 TV Nova (North Macedonia)
 TV Nova (Kumanovo)
 Nova+, Bulgaria
 Nova.rs, Serbia

See also